Avatha garthei is a species of moth of the family Erebidae. It is found on Nias, Sumatra, Borneo and in north-eastern India.

References

Moths described in 1989
Avatha
Moths of Indonesia
Moths of Asia